Metopocoilus rojasi is a species of beetle in the family Cerambycidae. It was described by Sallé in 1853.

References

Trachyderini
Beetles described in 1853